CJK Unified Ideographs is a Unicode block containing the most common CJK ideographs used in modern Chinese, Japanese, Korean and Vietnamese characters. When compared with other blocks containing CJK Unified Ideographs, it is also referred to as the Unified Repertoire and Ordering (URO).

The block has hundreds of variation sequences defined for standardized variants.

It also has tens of thousands of ideographic variation sequences registered in the Unicode Ideographic Variation Database (IVD).  These sequences specify the desired glyph variant for a given Unicode character.

Block

History
The following Unicode-related documents record the purpose and process of defining specific characters in the CJK Unified Ideographs block:

References 

Unicode blocks